In the UK, a compulsory stock obligation (CSO) is a minimum stock of fuel reserves that must be held by a supplier in the United Kingdom against shortages or interruptions in supply. The scheme is administered by the Department of Trade and Industry (DTI).

Companies incur an obligation if they are a supplier of a volume of 100,000 tonnes of fuel per annum or greater. This obligation is assessed as being a holding of 67.5 days' stock (50 days for the UK).

Petroleum in the United Kingdom